Matthew Dalton (born 16 November 1998) is an Irish rugby union player, currently playing for Premiership Rugby side Newcastle Falcons.  Dalton formerly played for Pro14 and European Rugby Champions Cup side Ulster. He plays primarily as a lock, but can also play as a flanker, and represented Malone in the All-Ireland League.

Early life
Dalton attended Belfast Royal Academy and, before committing to rugby, he excelled at association football and athletics, particularly the pentathlon. He helped the school to the semi-finals of the 2016 Ulster Schools' Cup, where they lost to Royal Belfast Academical Institution, as well as earning representation for Ulster at under-17, under-18 and under-18 level and Ireland at under-18, under-19 and under-20 level.

Club career
Dalton made his senior competitive debut for Ulster in their 23–22 win against Italian side Benetton in round 9 of the 2017–18 Pro14 on 24 November 2017.

Dalton signed for the Utah Warriors ahead of the 2021 Major League Rugby season.

On 22 June 2021, Dalton returns to the UK to join English side Newcastle Falcons in the Premiership Rugby on a two-year deal from the 2021-22 season.

International career
Dalton was selected for the Ireland under-20's squad for the 2018 Six Nations Under 20s Championship, and made his debut for the side in their opening round 34–24 defeat against France on 2 February 2018, before going on to start against Scotland and England. Dalton was also selected in the under-20s squad for the 2018 World Rugby Under 20 Championship, starting against Georgia and Scotland.

References

External links
Ulster Academy Profile
Pro14 Profile
U20 Six Nations Profile

1998 births
Living people
Irish rugby union players
Malone RFC players
Ulster Rugby players
Rugby union locks
Rugby union flankers
Utah Warriors players
Newcastle Falcons players